The 2003 African U-17 Championship qualification was a men's under-17 football competition which decided the participating teams of the 2003 African U-17 Championship.

Qualification

Preliminary round
The first leg matches were played on either 29 or 30 June 2002. The second leg matches were played on 14 July 2000. The winners advanced to the first round.

|}

First round
The first leg matches were played on either 21 or 22 December 2002. The second leg matches were played on either 11 or 12 January 2003, except for the Burkina Faso vs Sierra Leone match, which was played on 16 February. The winners advanced to the second round.
 

|}

Second round
The matches were played on different dates from 2 February to 15 March. The winners advanced to the finals.

|}

Qualified teams

 

 (host nation)

Notes and references

External links
 African U-17 Championship 2003 - rsssf.org

Under-17 Championship Qualification, 2003
2003